Boffius is a genus of mammal from the Paleocene of Europe, which was named by Vianey-Liaud M. in 1979. It is a member of the extinct order of Multituberculata. 

Boffius  lies within the suborder Cimolodonta and is the only known member of the family Boffiidae (Hahn & Hahn, 1983). The species Boffius splendidus is known from the Lower Paleocene Hainin Formation found in Hainaut, Belgium. It was a relatively large multituberculate.

References

Further reading 
 Vianey-Liaud (1979), "Les Mammifères montiens de Hainin (Paléocene moyen de Belgique). Part I, Multituberculés". Palaeovertebrata 9, p. 117-131.
 Kielan-Jaworowska Z & Hurum JH (2001), "Phylogeny and Systematics of multituberculate mammals". Paleontology 44, p. 389-429.
 Much of this information has been derived from  MESOZOIC MAMMALS; 'basal' Cimolodonta, Cimolomyidae, Boffiidae and Kogaionidae, an Internet directory.
 E. De Bast, B. Sigé, and T. Smith. 2012. Diversity of the adapisoriculid mammals from the early Palaeocene of Hainin, Belgium. Acta Palaeontologica Polonica 57(1):35-52

Cimolodonts
Danian genera
Paleocene mammals of Europe
Paleogene Belgium
Fossils of Belgium
Fossil taxa described in 1979
Prehistoric mammal genera